San Martino in Rio is a comune (municipality) in the Province of Reggio Emilia in the Italian region Emilia-Romagna, located about  northwest of Bologna and about  northeast of Reggio Emilia.

San Martino in Rio borders the following municipalities: Campogalliano, Correggio, Reggio Emilia, Rubiera.

References

Cities and towns in Emilia-Romagna